Wilberforce is a name, both a surname and a given name. It is also the name of an English family, including William Wilberforce. Notable people with the name include:

People

Surname
People with the surname include:
 William Wilberforce (1759–1833), British politician, evangelical reformer and campaigner against the slave trade
 Barbara Wilberforce (1777–1847), wife of William
 William Wilberforce (1798–1879), first and eldest son of William, a lawyer and Member of Parliament
 Robert Wilberforce (1802–1857), second son of William, a clergyman, Catholic convert and writer
 Lionel Wilberforce (1861–1944), British physicist, grandson of Robert and inventor of the Wilberforce pendulum
 Herbert Wilberforce (1864–1941), British male tennis player, grandson of Robert and chairman of the All England Lawn Tennis and Croquet Club 
 Samuel Wilberforce (1805–1873), third son of William, a bishop who debated the theory of evolution with Thomas Henry Huxley
 Ernest Wilberforce (1840–1907), Anglican bishop and third son of Samuel
 Basil Wilberforce (1841–1916), Anglican priest, Archdeacon of Westminster and fourth and youngest son of Samuel
 Richard Wilberforce, Baron Wilberforce (1907–2003), great-grandson of Samuel, Law Lord
 Henry Wilberforce (1807–1873), fourth and youngest son of William, Catholic convert, journalist and author
 Marion Wilberforce (1902–1995), aviator
 Octavia Wilberforce (1888–1963), English physician
 Robert Wilberforce (cricketer) (1910–1987), Australian cricketer
 Susan Wilberforce, suspect in the 1987 murder of Simon Dale; great-great-granddaughter of William Wilberforce

Given name
People with the given name include:
 Wilberforce Eames (1855–1937), American bibliographer and librarian
 Wilberforce Eaves (1867–1920), Australian-born tennis player from the United Kingdom
 Wilberforce Echezona, Nigerian musicologist and teacher
 Wilberforce Juta (1944–2020), Nigerian politician
 Wilberforce Kityo Luwalira (born 1958), Ugandan Anglican bishop
 Wilberforce Mfum (born 1936), retired Ghanaian footballer
 Wilberforce Kisamba Mugerwa (1945–2021), Ugandan agricultural economist, politician and academic
 Wilberforce Ocran (born 1999), English professional footballer
 Wilberforce Talel (born 1980), Kenyan runner

Middle name
People with the middle name include:
 Ronald Wilberforce Allen (1889–1936), English lawyer and Liberal politician
 Samuel Wilberforce Awuku-Darko (1924–?), Ghanaian accountant and politician
 Vincent Wilberforce Baddeley (1874–1961), British civil servant
 William Wilberforce Bird (merchant) (1758–1836), British merchant, civil servant and author; Member of Parliament for Coventry
 William Wilberforce Bird (governor) (1784–1857), his son; British colonial administrator, Deputy Governor of Bengal, and Governor-General of India
 Edwin Wilberforce Carrington, Tobagonian diplomat; former Secretary-General of the Caribbean Community
 Henry Wilberforce Clarke (1840–1905), British translator of Persian works
 Charles Wilberforce Daniels (1862–1927), British physician
 William Gabula (William Wilberforce Gabula Nadiope IV; born 1988), the reigning Kyabazinga of Busoga, a constitutional kingdom in modern-day Uganda
 William Wilberforce Harris Greathed (1826–1878), British senior officer in the Bengal Engineers
 Arthur Wilberforce Jose (1863–1934), English-Australian historian and editor
 George Wilberforce Kakoma (1923–2012), Ugandan musician who wrote Uganda's national anthem
 James Wilberforce Longley (1849–1922), Canadian journalist, lawyer, politician, and judge
 William Wilberforce Newton (1843–1914), American Episcopalian divine and author
 Harold Wilberforce Hindmarsh Stephen (1841–1889), Australian politician
 James Wilberforce Stephen (1822–1881), Australian politician

Fictional characters
 Mr. Wilberforce Clayborne Humphries, a character in the 1970s British sitcom Are You Being Served?
 Mr. Wilberforce, a character in the children's novel, Under the Mountain, by Maurice Gee
 The Wilberforces, antagonists in the New Zealand children's TV horror-sci-fi show Under the Mountain, based on the novel by Maurice Gee
 Mrs. Louisa Wilberforce, one of the main characters in the film The Ladykillers
 Wilberforce Thornapple, a character in the comic strip The Born Loser
 Mayor Wilberforce Cranklepot, a character in Blinky Bill the Movie and The Wild Adventures of Blinky Bill
 Bertie Wooster (Bertram Wilberforce Wooster), a character in the comedic Jeeves stories
 Colonel Sir Harold Wilberforce Clifton, main character of the Franco-Belgian comics series Clifton
 Colonel Wilberforce Buckshot, a character in the Laurel and Hardy film Another Fine Mess

See also
 Wilberforce (cat), who lived at 10 Downing Street between 1973 and 1987
 Wilberforce (disambiguation)

English families